The Fort McHenry Tunnel is a four-tube, bi-directional tunnel that carries traffic on Interstate 95 (I-95) underneath the Baltimore Harbor. The lowest point in the Interstate System under water, the tunnel is named for nearby Fort McHenry.

The tunnel was constructed from May 1980 to November 1985, at a cost of about $750 million. At the time of its opening on November 23, 1985, it was the most expensive underwater tunnel project in the United States, a record it held until being surpassed by the Big Dig project in Boston. , it is used by 43.4 million vehicles annually.

Tolls are collected in both directions. The toll for cars is $3 with a Maryland E-ZPass and $4 with another state's E-ZPass. Vehicles without an E-ZPass pay more, as do those with more than two axles, up to $45 for a 6+ axle vehicle without an E-ZPass. All-electronic tolling using E-ZPass or toll-by-plate started in March 2020 as a result of the COVID-19 pandemic and was made permanent in August 2020. A project to demolish the toll plaza and replace it with overhead gantries started in 2022.

Location

The tunnel crosses the Patapsco River, just south of Fort McHenry and connects the Locust Point and Canton areas of Baltimore City.

Design and construction

Plans for a second crossing of the Baltimore Harbor that would become the Fort McHenry Tunnel began in the late 1960s. Early plans called for an 8-lane double-deck bridge to carry I-95 over the harbor just south of Fort McHenry. In 1975, plans were changed from a bridge to a tunnel when it was determined that a bridge would have detrimental impact on Fort McHenry's status as a national monument. The state of Maryland originally intended to build the tunnel with a reinforced concrete box design, but plans were changed in February 1976 to use a steel tubular design after a dispute with the Federal Highway Administration. The tunnel was to be constructed using the immersed tube method, with prefabricated tubes sunken into the harbor.

Construction began in May 1980 by K-R-T (a joint venture between Peter Kiewit Sons Company, Raymond International Builders, and Tidewater Construction Corporation), and was completed in November 1985. 90 percent of construction costs were covered by federal funding, while 10 
percent came from state funding.

The opening of the tunnel closed a gap that previously existed in I-95 through Maryland. The Fort McHenry Tunnel was opened on time and under its budget, and it continues to be a vital transportation link in the Mid-Atlantic region. Soon after the Fort McHenry Tunnel opened, the nearby Baltimore Harbor Tunnel, which had opened to traffic in 1957, was extensively rehabilitated.

See also

Francis Scott Key Bridge (Baltimore)

References

External links

Fort McHenry Tunnel—history and technical info by Roads to the Future

Crossings of the Patapsco River
Transportation buildings and structures in Baltimore
Toll tunnels in Maryland
Tolled sections of Interstate Highways
Interstate 95
Tunnels completed in 1985
Articles containing video clips
Road tunnels in Maryland
Immersed tube tunnels in the United States